"Rue des Étoiles" (English: "Stars Street") is a 2009 song recorded by French singer-songwriter Grégoire and produced by Franck Authié under My Major Company label. It was the second single from his debut album Toi + Moi and was released in February 2009. The song became a top ten hit in Belgium (Wallonia), and achieved minor success in Switzerland. It was heavily played in Russia.

Charts

References

2009 singles
Grégoire (musician) songs
Songs written by Grégoire (musician)
2008 songs